DWAW (999 AM) was a radio station owned by ConAmor Broadcasting System and operated by the Batangas City Public Information Office. Its studios and transmitter were located at Brgy. Sampaga Centro, Batangas City.

The station operated daily from 5:00 am – 5:00 pm throughout its existence. The station was the sole operating AM station in Batangas after the closure of DWAM 1080 kHz in 2002, until its closure in July 2013 due to financial constraints and signal interference with DZIQ 990. Since April 2017, DZBR 531 is the third broadcaster to become the sole AM station in the province.

History

2008-2011: Operations and inactivity
DWAW went on the air in February 2008 with regional staples syndicated by ConAmor Broadcasting System such as Bagong Bayo in the morning drive-time hours and music fillers in the afternoon and on weekends.

However, in mid-2011, the station temporarily closed down due to financial constraints and alleged poor management.

2012-2013: Return of operations and second closure
The station returned operations by the latter part of 2012 as a joint operation by ConAmor and the Batangas City Public Information Office. With the resurrected format, the Quezon-based network shoehorned its syndicated material with the PIO's during the weekdays with room for local unaffiliated content within the broadcast day.

It covered the 2013 midterm elections. In July 2013, The station was closed down for good due to financial constraints. ConAmor opted to keep DWTI as their sole AM holding in Calabarzon.

Area of coverage
DWAW's signal covered all Batangas province and neighboring areas to the north and east. It had a northward directional antenna angle in order to protect the nighttime signal of DYSS, a Cebu-based station broadcasting on the same frequency with 10 kW of power. However, DWAW's proximity to Cebu's full-power operation on its frequency and DZIQ 990 heavily affect the signal of the station due to the latter's 50,000 watt maximum signal strength, hastening DWAW's closure in 2013.

References

Radio stations in Batangas
Radio stations established in 2008
Radio stations disestablished in 2013
Defunct radio stations in the Philippines